Clube Nacional de Benguela, founded on June 24, 1920, as Sports Clube Portugal de Benguela or simply Portugal de Benguela, is a sports club from Benguela, Angola. The Elephants won five titles during the then overseas province of Angola. Even before Angola's independence in 1975, the club's name was changed to Sports Club Nacional de Benguela. In 1979, the club, then Clube Nacional de Benguela, was one of the founders of Angola's premier football league (Girabola), in which season it finished as the runner-up by losing to Primeiro de Agosto 2–1 in the final.

The club has been banned by FIFA from entering any official competition until a debt with former coach Álvaro Magalhães is settled.

Stadium
Nacional de Benguela is the owner of Estádio São Filipe.

Achievements
Angolan League: 

Angolan Cup: 

Angolan SuperCup:

Manager history and performance

League & Cup Positions

Players

2011-2013

1991-2000

1979-1984

See also
Girabola
Gira Angola

External links
 2012 squad at Girabola.com

References

Association football clubs established in 1920
Football clubs in Angola
Sports clubs in Angola